

Legend

List

References

2006-07